Parsons House can refer to:

United Kingdom
Parsons House, London, a residential skyscraper in Westminster

United States

(by state, then city/town)

 Gridley-Parsons-Staples Homestead, Farmington, Connecticut, listed on the National Register of Historic Places (NRHP) in Hartford County
 Samuel Parsons House, Wallingford, Connecticut, listed on the NRHP in New Haven County
 Stephen Parsons House, Edgecomb, Maine, listed on the NRHP in Lincoln County
 Marion Parsons House, Fryeburg, Maine, listed on the NRHP in Oxford County
 Robinson-Parsons Farm, Paris, Maine, listed on the NRHP in Oxford County
 Parsons-Piper-Lord-Roy Farm, Parsonsfield, Maine, listed on the NRHP in York County
 Josiah K. Parsons Homestead, Wiscasset, Maine, listed on the NRHP in Lincoln County
 Edward Parsons House, Newton, Massachusetts, listed on the NRHP in Middlesex County
 C.H. Parsons House, Crystal Springs, Mississippi, listed on the NRHP in Copiah County
 Parsons Homestead, Rye, New Hampshire, listed on the NRHP in Rockingham County
 Ambrose Parsons House, Springs, New York, listed on the NRHP in Suffolk County
 John and Elsie Parsons House, Forest Grove, Oregon, listed on the NRHP in Washington County
 Parsons-Taylor House, Easton, Pennsylvania, listed on the NRHP in Northampton County
 Booth-Parsons House, Salt Lake City, Utah, listed on the NRHP in Salt Lake County
 William Parsons House, Seattle, Washington, listed on the NRHP in King County